Henry Gill S.J., M.C., D.S.O., was an Irish Jesuit priest, scientist, who for four years served as a chaplain in the great war. Fr. Gill earned Military Cross, Distinguished Service Order, serving with the 2nd Royal Irish Rifles.
Henry Vincent Gill, was born in Cabra, Dublin, on June 8  1872, he was the son of Henry Joseph Gill former Irish Party MP and manager of the family M. H. Gill and Sons publishing company.
Henry was educated at the Jesuit Clongowes Wood College and in 1890 joined the Jesuits first going to St Stanislaus College in Tullabeg, Co. Offally, then to Milltown Park, also studying Mathematics and Science at University College Dublin(Royal University of Ireland). He studied Philosophy at the Catholic University of Louvain, returned to Milltown to complete his clerical training in Theology, and was ordained in Milltown in 1906. He continued his studies in England with the famous Professor J. J. Thomson, Cavendish Laboratories, Cambridge from 1906 to 1908.  He conducted theoretical research into seismology which encouraged other jesuits to pursue studies in the field.

He returned to Ireland and taught in jesuit schools in Mungret College, Limerick, Belvedere College, Dublin and Rathfarnam Castle. 

In 1914 just after the start of the first world war, he joined the 2nd Irish Rifles as a chaplain, serving for four years. He wrote in the Quarterly Irish Jesuits Studies Journal, campaigning trying to highlight interest with the Irish public, in the destruction of Belgium particularly the Colleges in Louvain, which had a long connection with Ireland, by the German Army. As well as documenting the war in his diary and with his correspondence, he keen photographer, many of his photographs survive.

Returning to Ireland he taught in the jesuit Belvedere College.

Fr Henry Gill died aged 73, on 27 November 1945.

Publications
 H. Gill, Louvain and Ireland, Studies, September 1914, pp.292-95 at p.292.
 H. Gill, The fate of the Irish flag at Ypres, Studies, March 1919, pp.119-128.
 H. Gill, Fact of Fiction in Modern Science, 1943.
 Henry V. Gill SJ MA MSc, Roger Boscovich (A short biography), M.H. Gill, 1941.

References

1872 births
1945 deaths
People educated at Clongowes Wood College
Alumni of University College Dublin
Alumni of Milltown Institute of Theology and Philosophy
Catholic University of Leuven (1834–1968) alumni
20th-century Irish Jesuits
Irish chaplains
20th-century Irish Roman Catholic priests
Catholic clergy scientists
Irish physicists